Băsești may refer to the following places in Romania:

Băsești, a commune in Maramureș County
Băsești, the former name of the commune Călmățuiu de Sus in Teleorman County
Băsești, the former name of the commune Viișoara in Vaslui County
Băsești (river), a tributary of the Sălaj in Maramureș County